Anthony Wayne Peterson (born January 23, 1972) is a former professional American football linebacker in the National Football League (NFL). He played six seasons for the San Francisco 49ers (1994–1996, 1998–1999) and the Chicago Bears (1997). He was one of 15 members of the 1993 Notre Dame football team to be selected in the 1994 NFL Draft.

References 

1972 births
Living people
Players of American football from Cleveland
American football linebackers
Notre Dame Fighting Irish football players
San Francisco 49ers players
Chicago Bears players